This is a list of seasons completed by the San Jose Sharks of the National Hockey League. This list documents the records of the regular season and playoff results for all seasons the Sharks have completed in the NHL since their inception in 1991.

Table key

Year by year

1 Season was shortened due to the 1994–95 NHL lockout.
2 As of the 2005–06 NHL season, all games will have a winner; the OTL column includes SOL (Shootout losses).
3 Season was shortened due to the 2012–13 NHL lockout.
4 The season was suspended on March 12, 2020 because of the COVID-19 pandemic.
5 Season was shortened due to the COVID-19 pandemic.

All-time records

References

San Jose Sharks season statistics and records. @ hockeydb.com

National Hockey League team seasons
 
San Jose Sharks
seasons